The European Network of Civil Aviation Safety Investigation Authorities (ENCASIA) is a network of civil aviation accident investigation authorities of the European Union.

History 

ENCASIA was created by Regulation (EU) No 996/2010 in January 2011.

Members 

 Accident Investigation Board Denmark (Denmark)
 Administration for Technical Investigations (Luxembourg)
 Agenzia Nazionale per la Sicurezza del Volo (Italy)
 Air Accident and Incident Investigation Board (Cyprus)
 Air Accident Investigation and Aviation Safety Board (Greece)
 Air Accidents Investigation Institute (Czech Republic)
 Air Accident Investigation Unit (Ireland)
 Air Accident Investigation Unit (Belgium)
 Air Accident Investigation Unit (Bulgaria)
 Air, Maritime and Railway Traffic Accidents Investigation Agency (Croatia)
 Air, Maritime and Railway Accident and Incident Investigation Unit (Slovenia)
 Austrian Civil Aviation Accident Investigation Authority (Austria)
 Aviation and Maritime Investigation Authority (Slovakia)
 Bureau of Air Accident Investigation (Malta)
 Bureau of Enquiry and Analysis for Civil Aviation Safety (France)
 Civil Aviation Accident and Incident Investigation Commission (Spain)
 Civil Aviation Safety Investigation and Analysis Authority (Romania)
 Dutch Safety Board (Netherlands)
 Estonian Safety Investigation Bureau (Estonia)
 Gabinete de Prevenção e Investigação de Acidentes com Aeronaves e de Acidentes Ferroviários (Portugal)
 German Federal Bureau of Aircraft Accident Investigation (Germany)
 Safety Investigation Authority (Finland)
 State Commission on Aircraft Accidents Investigation (Poland)
 Swedish Accident Investigation Authority (Sweden)
 Transport Accident and Incident Investigation Bureau (Latvia)
 Transport Accident and Incident Investigation Division (Lithuania)
 Transportation Safety Bureau (Hungary)

See also 

 European Union Aviation Safety Agency
 National Transportation Safety Board (United States)
 Air Accidents Investigation Branch (United Kingdom)

References

External links 

 https://ec.europa.eu/transport/modes/air/encasia_en

European Union